Robert Emile DeLeo (born February 2, 1966) is an American musician, best known as the bassist for rock band Stone Temple Pilots. He is part of Delta Deep and he has also played in Talk Show and Army of Anyone. He is the younger brother of Stone Temple Pilots guitarist Dean DeLeo. He is also the former bass player for the supergroup Hollywood Vampires.

Early life
DeLeo and his older brother Dean were both born in New Jersey and raised in the Jersey Shore community of Point Pleasant Beach. He graduated from Point Pleasant Borough High School in 1984.

Their older half-brother is actor Scott Marlowe.

Career

Stone Temple Pilots (1985–2003, 2008–present)
DeLeo met Scott Weiland (who would eventually become lead singer of Stone Temple Pilots) at a Black Flag concert in Long Beach. They soon realized that they were both dating the same woman. After she moved to Texas, Weiland and DeLeo moved into her San Diego apartment, where they tried to form a band. They eventually hooked up with drummer Eric Kretz, and DeLeo managed to convince his brother Dean to play guitar in their new band. The band took the name Mighty Joe Young. They played many gigs in Los Angeles bars, and were eventually signed onto Atlantic Records in 1992. However, the name "Mighty Joe Young" had already been taken, so the band was forced to change their name and tossed around ideas like "Shirley Temple's Pussy" and "Sticky Toilet Paper" before changing it to "Stone Temple Pilots", which, according to Weiland, has no specific meaning, other than that it retained the STP initials.

During their years of greatest success in the 1990s, Stone Temple Pilots came to be one of the most successful bands of the decade. DeLeo is credited with much of the band's music, including the famous intros for the songs "Plush" and "Interstate Love Song". Although sales of their records exceeded over 30 million, the band disbanded due to Weiland's ongoing problems with drug abuse.

Stone Temple Pilots reunited in early 2008 and released their eponymous sixth studio album on May 25, 2010. On October 8, 2013, they released an EP entitled High Rise with new lead singer Chester Bennington of Linkin Park fame.

Later collaborations, 1997–present
During Stone Temple Pilots' hiatus in 1997 due to Weiland's run-ins with the law, DeLeo, his brother Dean, and Kretz joined with singer Dave Coutts of Ten Inch Men and formed Talk Show. Released in 1997 on Atlantic Records, their eponymous debut album peaked at #131 on the Billboard 200 and was considered a commercial flop. Coutts was eventually fired and the band disbanded. Weiland went into rehab and released a solo album during this time.

After Stone Temple Pilots' break-up in 2003, DeLeo and his brother Dean joined Filter frontman Richard Patrick and drummer Ray Luzier to form the band Army of Anyone. The group met after Patrick contacted the DeLeos about writing material for Filter's fourth album. The band eventually called in Luzier in for an audition, found the formula worked, and the band was formed. The band's self-titled debut album was released in November 2006. The album became a critical success; some went as far to label the album as one of the best of the year. DeLeo summed up his sound on the album as follows;

However, Army of Anyone ended up going on "indefinite hiatus" in 2007 after low album sales and Patrick's return to Filter.

In 2007, DeLeo played bass on songs for Japanese rock band B'z, including two on their album Action. He also contributes bass to five songs on their 2019 album New Love, including "Rain & Dream" which also features Joe Perry.

In 2016, DeLeo appeared with Kings of Chaos.

Solo career (2022–present)
On September 29, 2022, DeLeo announced his debut solo album Lessons Learned and released its lead single "Love is Not Made of Gold", featuring Jimmy Gnecco, the same day.

Equipment and style 

DeLeo is a former employee of Schecter Guitar Research and built the prototype of what later became his signature model while working there. The Schecter Model T was his primary live instrument during his years with Stone Temple Pilots. The basses original configuration featured a 34" scale neck and Seymour Duncan pickups in a "P/J" configuration. Schecter has since marketed several variants of this theme, including a 5-string model with a 35" scale length, and models with pickups from different manufacturers.

He is known for his smooth style of playing, with infusions of jazz, '60s rhythm and blues, and hard rock creating a rather distinctive tone. His primary influence is legendary bassist James Jamerson. Other influences include the late John Entwistle of the seminal rock band The Who, Rocco Prestia of Tower of Power, Chris Squire of Yes, and John Paul Jones of Led Zeppelin. DeLeo is known for his riffs; he created most of the signature riffs for Stone Temple Pilots, and wrote and arranged most of the band's songs.

Although he primarily uses the Schecter bass live, for recording purposes he has used a wide variety of basses, and has a fondness for oddball off-brand basses from the 1960s, particularly short-scale hollowbody basses which he strung with flat wound strings. In Army of Anyone's "Goodbye" video, he played a Rickenbacker bass.

DeLeo's usual live rig while with Stone Temple Pilots consists of an Alembic F1X preamp, a QSC MX1500 poweramp, three Eden 2x12 cabinets and three Eden 4x10 cabinets. One 2x12 and one 4x10 cab are placed on either side of the drum riser, and the third stack is placed on DeLeo's side of the stage and kept in reserve as a backup. He mostly uses Marshall and Fender amplification, but has been seen using vintage Ampeg amps and basses as well.

Stone Temple Pilots' debut album Core was recorded with a Jazz-type bass prototype version of his Schecter Model-T bass, a G&L L2000, and an Ampeg SVT amplifier with an 8x10 cabinet. Purple, their second album, was recorded with his live rig. DeLeo's usual studio rig for most of Tiny Music... Songs from the Vatican Gift Shop, all of No. 4, and all of Shangri-La-Dee-Da, all by Stone Temple Pilots, was more complicated; he split his signal, bi-amping it to a '67 50-watt Marshall Plexi guitar head with '69 Marshall keyboard 8x10 cabinet, and a '59 Fender Bassman amplifier with a custom 1x15 cabinet. This configuration, which DeLeo noted in a Bass Player Magazine article as being an idea he lifted from Chris Squire of Yes, allowed him to use distorted and clean sounds simultaneously and produce more workable sounds on tape by blending the signals to taste.

Among the basses he is known to have used during his years with Stone Temple Pilots are his Schecter Model T signature basses, a '66 Fender Precision Bass with flatwound strings (e.g. on "Sour Girl"), several shortscale hollowbody basses with flatwound strings (the bass on "Creep" was a Limgar; the one on "Big Empty" and "Atlanta" was an Orlando), a '76 Rickenbacker 4001 (on "Art School Girl"), and an unknown type of upright bass (on "Pretty Penny"). He is also known to have used a '50s Danelectro Longhorn and a Fender Musicmaster. Occasionally he uses Sansamp BDDI for extra drive, and used an MXR phase 90 on "And So I Know" and an EHX Micro Synth on "Transmissions from a Lonely Room", both by Stone Temple Pilots. He also uses a bass Wah-wah pedal to change his tone accordingly (a good example being on the Stone Temple Pilots song "Vasoline").

Production
DeLeo and his brother Dean produced the 2010 Stone Temple Pilots album Stone Temple Pilots, as well as Alien Ant Farm's TruANT in 2003.

Personal life 
DeLeo is married to Kristen and has two sons. He lives in Palos Verdes, California.

Discography

 Lessons Learned (2022)

References

External links

Guitaronemag.com

1966 births
Living people
American rock bass guitarists
American male bass guitarists
People from Montclair, New Jersey
People from Point Pleasant Beach, New Jersey
Point Pleasant Borough High School alumni
Guitarists from New Jersey
Stone Temple Pilots members
American people of Italian descent
20th-century American bass guitarists
21st-century American bass guitarists
American male guitarists
Musicians from the New York metropolitan area
Talk Show (band) members
Army of Anyone members
Hollywood Vampires (band) members